Lillian Miles (August 1, 1907 – February 27, 1972) was an American actress in several films in the 1930s.

Biography
Miles was born in 1907 in Oskaloosa, Iowa. Aside from singing and performing in the celebrated 'Continental' musical number in The Gay Divorcee (1934), starring Fred Astaire and Ginger Rogers, Miles's film career was brief, unremarkable, and confined to low-budget 'B' pictures. However, she has something of a cult following nowadays for her performance in the infamous anti-dope exploitation movie Reefer Madness, made in 1936. It is she who appears in the film's most remembered sequence, playing an increasingly frenzied piano solo while Dave O'Brien shouts "play it faster, faster!"

After a role in an Edgar Kennedy short in 1939 (Baby Daze), she retired from the screen. She died in 1972 in California.

Partial filmography
Man Against Woman (1932)
 Moonlight and Pretzels (1933)
 The Gay Divorcee (1934)
 The Knife of the Party (1934)
 The Headline Woman (1934)
 Code of the Mounted (1935)
 Get That Man (1935)
 Dizzy Dames (1935)
 Calling All Cars (1935)
 The Old Homestead (1935)
 Reefer Madness (1936)

External links
 

1907 births
1972 deaths
American film actresses
20th-century American actresses